Berden is a village and civil parish in Essex, England. Berden parish, with its own parish council, is in the district of Uttlesford and in the parliamentary constituency of Saffron Walden.

According to the 2001 census Berden had a population of 427, increasing to 465 at the census 2011.

Berden was part of Clavering hundred and is mentioned in the Domesday Book of 1086 as a location with four villagers and five smallholders.

St Nicholas' Church 

The parish church is dedicated to St Nicholas. Berden Hall dates to the 1580s, although a manor and Berden Priory existed in Berden in medieval times.

See also
 The Hundred Parishes

References

External links

Berden village web site
"Berden", Recordinguttlesfordhistory.org.uk

 
Villages in Essex
Civil parishes in Essex
Uttlesford